Serhiy Podryhulya (born 5 February 1992 in Lutsk, Volyn Oblast, Ukraine) is a professional Ukrainian football midfielder who plays for FC Volyn Lutsk in the Ukrainian Premier League.

Podryhulya began his playing career in sportive school in native town Lutsk, where he joined to FC Volyn Lutsk team. He made his first team debut entering as a second-half substitute against FC Enerhetyk Burshtyn on 16 June 2008.

In 2010, Podryhulya was called up to the Ukraine national under-19 football team for a series of matches in preparation for the 2012 UEFA European Under-19 Football Championship.

References

External links 
 Profile at Official club site 
 Profile at Official FFU site 
 
 

1992 births
Living people
Ukrainian footballers
FC Volyn Lutsk players
FC Karlivka players
Ukrainian expatriate footballers
Expatriate footballers in Poland
Association football midfielders
Footballers from Lutsk